The 2012–13 Dynamo Moscow season was the 90th season in the club's history. They participated in the Russian Premier League, finishing in 7th place, the Russian Cup, where they reached the Quarterfinal before losing to Anzhi Makhachkala, and the Europa League where they were eliminated at the Playoff round by Stuttgart.

Review and events

During the season, three managers worked with the first team:
Sergei Silkin worked at pre-season training, but resigned after the team was beaten on Matchday 3 by arch-rival Spartak 0–4 and sank to the bottom of the league table. This match was 9th in the row without victory, previous season included.

Dmitri Khokhlov was in charge as a caretaker manager for 3 games and brought home the first victory of the season – 5–0 over Dundee Utd in Europa League.
Dan Petrescu came in when the team was still 16th but managed to lift it to 9th position before winter break. In the spring Dynamo even made it temporarily to the Europa League spot, but failure to win the last game versus Volga at home lowered their final league position to 7th with no European football next season.

Kevin Kurányi started season as a captain of Dynamo Moscow. After arrival of Dan Petrescu as a new manager, captain's functions were delegated also to Igor Semshov, Leandro Fernández and Aleksandr Kokorin.

Matches and results

Legend

Russian Premier League

Results by matchday

Matches

Table

Russian Cup

Europa League

Third qualifying round

Playoff round

Statistics

Appearances and goals

|-
|colspan="14"|Players away from Dynamo on loan:

|-
|colspan="14"|Players who appeared for Dynamo no longer at the club:

|}

Scorers and Assistants

Disciplinary record

Transfers

In

Out

Out on loan

Youth squad
The following players are registered with the RFPL and are listed by club's website as youth players. They are eligible to play for the first team.

References

Dynamo Moscow
Dynamo Moscow
FC Dynamo Moscow seasons